Justice Robertson may refer to:

Alexander George Morison Robertson (1867–1947), associate justice of the Supreme Court of Hawaii
Edward D. Robertson Jr. (born 1952), chief justice of the Supreme Court of Missouri
George Morison Robertson (1821–1867), associate justice of the Supreme Court of Hawaii
James L. Robertson (Mississippi judge) (fl. 1960s–1990s), associate justice of the Supreme Court of Mississippi
Sawnie Robertson (1850–1892), associate justice of the Texas Supreme Court
Ted Z. Robertson (1921–2017), associate justice of the Texas Supreme Court
William J. Robertson (1817–1898), chief justice of the Supreme Court of Virginia

Title and name disambiguation pages